Longimactra elongata is a species of large bivalve mollusc in the family Mactridae.

References
 Powell A. W. B., New Zealand Mollusca, William Collins Publishers Ltd, Auckland, New Zealand 1979 

Mactridae
Bivalves of New Zealand